16 år ("16 Years") is a Swedish television series. It was first broadcast in 1960.

Cast
 Birgit Rosengren
 Håkan Westergren
 Sissi Kaiser
 Mats Hådell
 Jörgen Lindström
 Elof Ahrl

External links
 

1960 Swedish television series debuts
1960 Swedish television series endings
1960s Swedish television series